Shergarh , is an historic town, union council and major administrative subdivision of Depalpur Tehsil, Okara District, Punjab, Pakistan.

Location 
It is located in Okara district of Punjab.

History 

Sher Garh (literally "Lion's Den") is one of the most historic towns of the district, along with Haveli Lakha, Hujra Shah Muqeem, Basir Pur, Depalpur & Satghara among others. The 16th century governor of Multan, Fateh Jang Khan, named the town after the Afghan ruler of India, Sher Shah Suri, who built a mud fort and had an encampment around the town. This is recorded in Abbas Khan Sarauni's book, "Tarikh-e Sher Shah Suri" (History of Sher Shah Suri). Ancient coins & artefacts have been found, proving that the town must have been inhabited in the time of the Kushan Dynasty.

The town is well known all around the Punjab, for a famous late-sixteenth century Qadiriyyah Sufi saint, Daud Bandagi Kirmani, who lived and died in the town. He was born in Sitapur, village of modern-day Muzaffargarh District.His family had migrated from Kerman Province in Persia, and claimed descent from Prophet Mohammad.After receiving his formal religious and spiritual education from the pirs of Uch, he established himself in Shergarh, where he lived from then on until his death. He converted many tribes in the present-day districts of Faisalabad, Sialkot Sheikhupura. Hafizabad, Sahiwal & Gujranwala, and although he lived in Shergarh, he did not carry out much of his work in that area because most of the native tribes, such as the Wattu and Joiya had already previously been converted by Baba Farid of Pakpattan. The tribes converted by Daud Bandagi Kirmani include mainly Rajput & Jat clans of the above-mentioned areas. Some of these are Virks, Bajwas, Cheemas, Chatthas & Sahis.He is claimed to have converted 35,000 people to Islam, and 365 people to sainthood in all. Some of his prominent murids include Bala Pir, 'Abd al-Qadir Bada'uni, Wahab Chishti & Kamal Chishti. The saint died in 1575, after which his nephew and son-in law, Shah Abul Mu'aali, had a beautiful, large mausoleum erected for his grave. This mausoleum is visited by many "murids" in the month of March, when his  urs is held. Apart from his murids, the mausoleum attracts the attention of many curious travellers, artists & calligraphers all year round, as this mausoleum is one of the rare monuments in the country which has calligraphy and tile work in the "Naqashi style". The shrine used to be in the care of the local "Gaddi Nashin" (eldest direct descendant), but after the land reforms of Ayub Khan, it was turned to the Auqaf Deptt., Okara.

Language 

Most of the people of Shergarh speak Punjabi.

Agriculture and surroundings 
The town itself is located on the old river bed of the Beas, which extends south from Kasur, all the way to Chunian, and then Shergarh, in Okara District, before moving towards Gaimbar near Okara City. The mounds of the riverbed also act as a natural border between Renala Khurd Tehsil & Depalpur Tehsil. The subsoil water of the town itself is brackish, as well as the area in the west of the river bed. Towards the east green fields of potato, rice, maize and wheat, bordered on all sides by kikari and simbal are visible up to the horizon, as the area, below the riverbed, has subsoil water which is sweet, and rich in nutrients, unlike the brackish subsoil water on and west of the riverbed. when you go on chunian road, Hussain Garh the famous and historical village is there.this village has seven small village namely Hussain Garh, Tilawala, Landianwala, Kot Nawab Shah, Zameer Abad, Kot Khadim Hussain, ghurianwala.

Education and infrastructure 

Shergarh has a majority of people who cannot afford education, so in 1992, S.M Mohsin set up an NGO called "AKRA" (Anjuman-e Khuddam-e Rasulallah), At that time the NGO responsibility was given to the Late Mirza Aziz Ahmed Baig(RIP), With his total commitment to work and with the support of S.M Moshin, he remained in charge of Foundation for 28 years and spread the education throughout the village..  which provides high quality primary education for the native children of the town, for only Rs. 350/= per month, a price which is affordable for the guardians of the children. The organisation lays more stress on educating females. The main school is in Shergarh, called "Daud Bandagi High School".It also has many branches in the surrounding villages, whose mediums are usually mosques, but the main school is in Shergarh. The town consists of a NBP bank, a Jamia Mosque and a Government school. It has a small, non-functional dispensary, and the town is in dire need of a hospital. The district Nazim, Syed Sajjad Haider Kirmani, who is a native of the town, also got a sports stadium built just outside it, however since he has died, the project remains incomplete and is being used for anything but sports. The Jamia Mosque was a historical building built by Sher Shah Suri, but it was in bad condition and beautifully rebuilt by the Auqaf Department., Okara

Now in 2015 Shergard has more than 15 Schools and have a high literacy rate.

Shergarh is connected by road to six towns, namely Chunian, Wan Radha Ram, Depalpur, Renala Khurd, Akhtarabad & Hujra Shah Muqeem. The road leading to Renala Khurd is the best maintained road leading into Shergarh, it was built when Syed Sajjad Haider Kirmani was nazim of the district. The road leading to the town of Hujra Shah Muqeem, is 7.5 miles long and is also in good condition, but quite narrow. In historic times, the pirs of Shergarh and Hujra, did not get along very well, so when they'd refer to each other's towns, they'd use the derogatory name of the time, panjkoa (7 miles away), instead of using the proper names. The other roads are very dangerous as most of them have deep depressions making it very difficult to drive. The road leading to the town of Akhtarabad is famous for robberies and killings that occur mostly after sun-
Shergarh consist of Govt boys higher secondary school and Govt girls higher secondary in sher garh gives the education all over villages and town  sher garh and no available the  any collage but very important requirement the boys and girls collage at city

Main tribes
 Akhund
 Arain
 Bhutto
 Ensari
 Hashmi
 Baloch
 Bhatti
 Chauhan
 Daula
 Jappa
 Jurrera
 Joiya
 Kasai
 Kirmani
 Kumhar
 Lohar
 Mughal
 Machhi
 Mirasi
 Mochi
 Nai
 Pathan 
 Qazi
 Ranghar
 Rajput
 Shaikh
 Sial
 Tarkhan
 Wattu
 Khakhra 
 Jut

See also
Daud Bandagi Kirmani
Depalpur
Hujra Shah Muqeem
Okara District
Qadiriyya
Renala Khurd
Sufism
Sayed Jaffar Shah

References

Union councils of Okara District